Jensa K. Tórolvsdóttir (born 3 August 2001) is a Faroese football midfielder who currently plays for Víkingur Gøta. Since 2020, she has represented the Faroe Islands women's national football team at senior international level.

Club career
In December 2021 Tórolvsdóttir was chosen the  midfielder of the year and also entered in the team of the year in Faroese football after scoring 17 goals and assisting 15 (best result in the Betri Deildin 2021.) for Víkingur Gøta.

International career
Tórolvsdóttir's first appearances for the senior Faroe Islands came in September 2020, at the UEFA Women's Euro 2022 qualifying round against Northern Ireland women's national football team. And in the away game, she scored her first goal for the national team

International goals

References

External links
Jensa Tórolvsdóttir at UEFA.com
Jensa Tórolvsdóttir at FaroeSoccer.com

Living people
Faroe Islands women's international footballers
Women's association football midfielders
Víkingur Gøta players
Faroese women's footballers
2001 births